Encelia nutans, called noddinghead, or nodding sunray, is a North American species of flowering plants in the family daisy family. It has been found only in Utah and Colorado in the western United States.

Encelia nutans is a shrub up to 25 cm (10 inches) tall, with swollen roots up to 10 cm (4 inches) in diameter. Leaves are small and green, egg-shaped, rarely more than 5 cm (2 inches) long. Flower heads are produced one per stem, with yellow disc florets but no ray florets.

References

External links
 USDA Plants Profile for Encelia nutans (nodding sunray)

nutans
Flora of Colorado
Flora of Utah
Endemic flora of the United States
Plants described in 1891
Taxa named by Alice Eastwood
Flora without expected TNC conservation status